A Blank on the Map is a television documentary made by the BBC which was written and presented by David Attenborough filmed in New Guinea. It was first transmitted in the UK on 29 December 1971 and is now available on the DVD collection Attenborough in Paradise and Other Personal Voyages.

Synopsis 
The documentary follows Attenborough as he joins Ambunti Patrol No 19/1970-71 (3 May to 10 June 1971), led by ADC Laurie Bragge, crossing through a previously unexplored region in search of an uncontacted people known as the Bikaru.  However, a setback is encountered when a translator from Bisorio could not be found. After several weeks in the interior, with no sighting of any Bikaru people, the expedition eventually encounters signs of human habitation and, toward the conclusion of their journey, they are approached by a small tribe of Biami natives who allegedly had never before had contact with the outside world.  The curious and friendly tribe engages in some minor trading with the expedition.  They become alarmed, however, when Attenborough and company attempt to follow them to their homes.  The tribe suddenly disappears into the forest and are not seen again. After this point the BBC crew were flown out and the rest of the patrol returned to Ambunti.

External links

Ambunti Patrol No 19/1970-7 report http://library.ucsd.edu/dc/object/bb0172517z

BBC television documentaries
Documentary films about nature
British television films
Documentary films about race and ethnicity